Chah Goda (also Romanized as Chāh Godā; also known as Chāh Khodā) is a village in Rudkhaneh Bar Rural District, Rudkhaneh District, Rudan County, Hormozgan Province, Iran. At the 2006 census, its population was 18, in 4 families.

References 

Populated places in Rudan County